The 1972 Singapore Open, also known as the 1972 Singapore Open Badminton Championships, took place from 24 to 28 October 1972 at the Singapore Badminton Hall in Singapore.

Venue
Singapore Badminton Hall

Final results

References 

Singapore Open (badminton)
1972 in badminton
1972 in Singaporean sport